John David Hennessey (1847 – 31 July 1935), also known as Rev. J. D. Hennessey and David Hennessey, journalist and author, was born in London and went to Australia in 1875. He lived in Queensland, New South Wales and Victoria.

Hennessey was a Methodist and Congregational minister and preached at the Wharf street Congregational Church in Brisbane and the Pitt street Congregational Church in Sydney. He founded the Australian Christian World in 1886 and edited it until 1891. In 1894 he edited the Australian Field, a weekly agricultural paper.

Hennessey retired from journalism when about seventy years old, however he continued his literary work until shortly before his death, which occurred after a brief illness. He was buried at the Dromana Cemetery.

As well as short stories in magazines in Australia and England, Hennessey published several novels. One, The Outlaw, was awarded second prize of £400 in a £1,000 novel competition.

Bibliography 

 The Dis-Honourable (1895)
 An Australian Bush Track ('The Bush Track: A Story of the Australian Bush') (1896)
 Wynnum ('Wynnum White's Wickedness') (1896)
 A Lost Identity ('The Bells of Sydney'; 'Gunnery of Church-Conset') (1897)
 The New Chum Farmer (1897)
 The Outlaw (1913)
 A Tail of Gold (1914)
 The Caves of Shend (1915)
 The Cords of Vanity (1920)

External links
 Works by John David Hennessey at Project Gutenberg Australia

References

 The Oxford Companion to Australian Literature, second edition, 1994, Oxford University Press.
 Australian Literature a Bibliography to 1938 Extended to 1950 (Angus and Robertson, 1956), page 228, by Miller and Macartney.
 The Argus, Melbourne, Friday 2 August 1935.

1847 births
1935 deaths
19th-century Australian novelists
20th-century Australian novelists
Australian male novelists
Australian male short story writers
Australian journalists
English people of Irish descent
Australian people of Irish descent
19th-century Australian short story writers
19th-century male writers
20th-century Australian short story writers
20th-century Australian male writers